Shorea foxworthyi is a species of plant in the family Dipterocarpaceae. It is a tree found in Thailand, Peninsular Malaysia, Sumatra and Borneo.

See also
List of Shorea species

References

foxworthyi
Trees of Thailand
Trees of Sumatra
Trees of Borneo
Taxonomy articles created by Polbot